Sudan competed at the 2022 World Aquatics Championships in Budapest, Hungary from 18 June to 3 July.

Open water swimming

Swimming

References

Nations at the 2022 World Aquatics Championships
Sudan at the World Aquatics Championships
World Aquatics Championships